Roger Hanin (born Roger Levy, 20 October 1925 – 11 February 2015) was a French actor and film director, best known for playing the title role in the 1989–2006 TV police drama, Navarro.

Career
Roger Hanin was born in 1925 in Algiers, Algeria as Roger Lévy to Jewish parents. His brother-in-law was François Mitterrand (the former President of France), whose wife, the Danielle, was the sister of Hanin's wife, Christine Gouze-Rénal.

With Claude Chabrol, Hanin co-wrote the scripts for a pair of spy films in the mid-1960s. Chabrol directed Code Name: Tiger (1964) and Our Agent Tiger (1965), both featuring Hanin in the starring role of secret agent Le Tigre.

Awards and honours
His 1985 film, Hell Train, was entered into the 14th Moscow International Film Festival where it won a Special Prize.

In September 2000 he was awarded a place on the honourable list of the National Order of Merit of Algeria. He said: "I always refused decorations. This is the first time that I agree, but it's also the last because I want it to be unique."

Filmography

Actor
{| class="wikitable"
! style="background: #CCCCCC;" | Year
! style="background: #CCCCCC;" | Title
! style="background: #CCCCCC;" | Role
! style="background: #CCCCCC;" | Director
! style="background: #CCCCCC;" | Notes
|-
|1952
|The Road to Damascus
|Un disciple
|Max Glass
|
|-
|1953
|La môme vert-de-gris
|a bodyguard
|Bernard Borderie
|
|- 
|1954
|Les Impures
|Le client de Lili
|Pierre Chevalier
|Uncredited
|-
|rowspan=5|1955
|Série noire
|Ménard
|Pierre Foucaud
|
|-
|Gas-Oil
|René Schwob
|Gilles Grangier
|
|-
|Les Hussards
|a soldier 
|Alex Joffé
|Uncredited
|- 
|Les salauds vont en enfer
|Un mauvais garçon
|Robert Hossein
|Uncredited
|-
|Vous pigez ?
|Istria
|Pierre Chevalier
|
|-
|rowspan=2|1957
|He Who Must Die
|Pannagotaros
|Jules Dassin
|
|-
|Escapade
|Olivier
|Ralph Habib
|
|-
|rowspan=5|1958
|Tamango
|First Mate Bebe
|John Berry
|
|- 
| The Cat 
|Pierre
|Henri Decoin
|
|- 
|Be Beautiful But Shut Up
|Charlemagne
|Marc Allégret
|
|-
|Le désordre et la nuit
|Albert Simoni
|Gilles Grangier
|
|-
|Sunday Encounter
|Robert Sartori
|Marc Allégret
|
|-
|rowspan=5|1959
|Ramuntcho
|Itchoa
|Pierre Schoendoerffer
|
|-
|
|Géo Paquet a.k.a. le Gorille
|Bernard Borderie
|
|-
|Du rififi chez les femmes
|Bug
|Alex Joffé
|
|-
|Le Fric
|Robert Bertin
|Maurice Cloche
|
|-
|The Verdict
|Antoine Castellani
|
|
|-
|rowspan=4|1960
|Breathless
|Cal Zombach
|Jean-Luc Godard
|
|-
|
|Serge Cazais
|Charles Gérard
|
|-
|Rocco and His Brothers
|Morini
|Luchino Visconti
|
|- 
|
|Michel Ferréol
|Henri Verneuil
|
|- 
|rowspan=3|1961
|Vive Henri IV, vive l'amour
|Ravaillac
|Claude Autant-Lara
|
|-
|Le Miracle des loups
|Charles the Bold
|André Hunebelle
|
|- 
|
|Inspecteur Landais
|Jacques Guymont
|
|- 
|rowspan=4|1962
|
|Capitaine Jean de Lursac
|Édouard Molinaro 
|
|-
|Carillons sans joie
|Maurice
|Charles Brabant
|
|-
|
|Géo Paquet a.k.a. le Gorille
|Maurice Labro
|
|- 
|March on Rome
|Capitaine Paolinelli
|Dino Risi
|
|-
|1963
|Portuguese Vacation
|
|Pierre Kast
|Uncredited
|-
|rowspan=2|1964
|
|Ernest Charnot
|Werner Klingler
|
|-
|Le Tigre aime la chair fraiche
|Louis Rapière a.k.a. le Tigre
|Claude Chabrol
|
|-
|rowspan=5|1965
|Passeport diplomatique agent K 8
|Mirmont
|Robert Vernay
|
|-
|Un mari à prix fixe
|Romain de Brétigny
|Claude de Givray
|
|-
|Code Name: Jaguar
|Bob Stuart
|Maurice Labro
|
|-
|Marie-Chantal contre le docteur Kha
|Bruno Kerrien
|Claude Chabrol
|
|- 
|Our Agent Tiger
|Louis Rapière a.k.a. le Tigre
|Claude Chabrol
|
|-
|rowspan=5|1966
|Via Macau
|Michel
|Jean Leduc
|
|-
|Our Men in Bagdad
|Sadov
|Paolo Bianchini
|
|-
|The Brides of Fu Manchu
|Pierre Grimaldi
|Don Sharp
|
|-
|Four Queens for an Ace
|Dan Layton
|Jacques Poitrenaud
|
|-
|
|Frank Norman
|Ralph Habib
|
|-
|rowspan=3|1967
|Da Berlino l'Apocalisse
|Saint Dominique
|Mario Maffei
|
|-
|Le chacal traque les filles
|François Merlin, dit le Chacal
|Jean-Michel Rankovitch
|
|-
|
|François Cartier
|Jacques Poitrenaud
|
|-
|1968
|They Came to Rob Las Vegas
|the Boss
|Antonio Isasi-Isasmendi
|
|-
|rowspan=3|1969
|
|Michel Fauvel
|
|
|-
|La Main'
|L'inspecteur / Le producteur
|Henri Glaeser
|
|-
|Plus jamais seuls|Stéphane
|Jean Delire
|
|-
|rowspan=2|1970
|Le clair de terre|M. Brumeu, le père de Pierre
|Guy Gilles
|
|-
|Senza via d'uscita|Kurt
|Michael Pressman
|
|-
|rowspan=2|1971
|Une femme libre|André
|Claude Pierson
|
|-
|Les Aveux les plus doux|Inspecteur Borelli
|Édouard Molinaro
|
|-
|1972
|The Revengers|Quiberon
|Daniel Mann
|
|-
|rowspan=3|1973
|La raison du plus fou|Le patron de l'hôtel
|François Reichenbach
|
|-
|Le concierge|Barbarin - un industriel
|Jean Girault
|
|-
|Tony Arzenta|Carré
|
|
|-
|1974
|Le Protecteur|Julien da Costa
|Roger Hanin
|
|-
|rowspan=2|1975
|L'intrépide|Canello
|Jean Girault
|
|-
|Le faux-cul|Belkacem
|Roger Hanin
|
|-
|rowspan=2|1978
|The Pocket Lover|Barbouze ministre 1
|Bernard Queysanne
|
|-
|Le Sucre|Karbaoui
|Jacques Rouffio
|
|-
|1979
||Albert Narboni
|Alexandre Arcady
|
|-
|1980
|Certaines nouvelles|Georges
|Jacques Davila
|
|-
|rowspan=3|1982
||Raymond Bettoun
|Alexandre Arcady
|
|- 
|Les Misérables|the innkeeper
|Robert Hossein
|
|-
|La Baraka|Aimé Prado
|Jean Valère
|
|-
|rowspan=2|1983
|My Other Husband|Philippe
|Georges Lautner
|
|-
|Le Grand Carnaval|Léon Castelli
|Alexandre Arcady
|
|-
|1985
|Hell Train|Commissaire Couturier
|Roger Hanin
|
|-
|rowspan=2|1986
|La Galette du roi|Victor Harris
|Jean-Michel Ribes
|
|-
|L'étincelle|Maurice
|Michel Lang
|
|-
|rowspan=3|1987
|Lévy et Goliath|Voix de Dieu
|Gérard Oury
|Uncredited
|-
|La rumba|Beppo Manzoni
|Roger Hanin
|
|-
|Dernier été à Tanger|William Barrès, le maître de Tanger
|Alexandre Arcady
|
|-
|1989
|L'Orchestre rouge|Berzine
|Jacques Rouffio
|
|-
|1990
|Jean Galmot, aventurier|Georges Picard, le gouverneur
|Alain Maline
|
|-
|1992
|Day of Atonement|Raymond Bettoun
|Alexandre Arcady
|
|-
|1993
|Le Nombril du monde|Scali
|Ariel Zeitoun
|
|-
|1997
|Soleil|Prof. Meyer Lévy
|Roger Hanin
|
|}

ProducerSoleil'' (1997) with Marianne Sägebrecht

References

External links

1925 births
2015 deaths
Place of death missing
Actors from Algiers
Algerian Jews
Jewish French male actors
French male film actors
French male television actors
French film directors
Pieds-Noirs